Gorga is a comune (municipality) in the Metropolitan City of Rome in the Italian region Lazio, located about  southeast of Rome.

Geography
Gorga borders the following municipalities: Anagni, Carpineto Romano, Montelanico, Morolo, Sgurgola, Supino.

References

External links

Cities and towns in Lazio